The Japanese yen is the unit of currency in Japan.

Yen or YEN may also refer to:

Currency
 Japanese military yen, scrip issued to Japanese soldiers overseas
 Korean yen, the currency of Korea from 1910–1945
 Taiwanese yen, the currency of Taiwan from 1895–1946

Other uses
 Yan (surname) or Yen
 Yen (band), a German rock band
 "Yen", a song by Slipknot from the 2022 album The End, So Far
 YEN, the IATA code of Estevan Regional Aerodrome
 C. K. Yen (1905–1993), former President of the Republic of China
 Youth Employment Network, a joint UN-ILO-World Bank jobs program

See also
¥, the Latinized symbol of the yen
Yuan (disambiguation)